The Doombots are fictional robots appearing in American comic books published by Marvel Comics.

History
The Doombots are robots that are modeled after their creator Doctor Doom. They are exact replicas of the real Doctor Doom and were created to replace Doctor Doom in certain situations and were made with an advanced A.I. program which causes them to believe each is the real Doctor Doom, much in the same way as a Life Model Decoy. Doctor Doom designed two different types of replica: fighting Doombots and diplomat Doombots. They are used when Doctor Doom is not confident that he would win. All Doombots are programmed by Doctor Doom and include remote shut off in the case that one should rise against Doom himself. The Doombots first appear where they help to capture the Fantastic Four so that Doctor Doom can send Mister Fantastic, Human Torch, and Thing back in time to retrieve Blackbeard's treasure while he was using Invisible Woman as a hostage.

The Doombots later help Doctor Doom to capture Spider-Man, but accidentally captured Flash Thompson disguised as him.

The Doombots were present when Doctor Doom empowered three criminals to be the Terrible Trio.

During his plan to drive Doctor Doom out of Latveria, Prince Rudolfo has a woman named Ramona (who resembles Doctor Doom's childhood love Valeria) be picked up by a patrolling Doombot. Following the Doomsman that Doctor Doom had created coming to life, Doctor Doom sends the Doombots to deal with Prince Rudolfo and his men.

A Doombot in the form of Doctor Doom captured Arcade and the families of the X-Men so that the X-Men can come after Arcade. This caused the X-Men's Team 1 (consisting of Angel, Colossus, Nightcrawler, Storm, Wolverine) to go after Doctor Doom while Banshee, Havok, Iceman, and Polaris head to Murderworld to rescue the captive parents. This turned out to be a trap for Team 1 since the Doombot is actually in an alliance with Arcade. Arcade and the Doombot have designed the traps that the captive X-Men members are placed in. The captive family members at Murderworld turn out to be robots that attacks the X-Men members that were sent there. When Storm becomes one with the planet, she attacks the Doombot

Puppet Master later makes a doll of Doctor Doom as he controls Doctor Doom into sending his Doombots to attack the Fantastic Four.

Doctor Doom later sends his Doombots to abduct a heavily damaged "John Doe" from a Manhattan hospital. The "John Doe" turns out to be a depowered Terrax as Doctor Doom offers to help him regain his powers. While Human Torch and Thing are fighting Terrax, Invisible Woman encounters a Doombot in the form of Doctor Doom and easily destroys it.

Doctor Doom leads the Doombots into capturing Franklin Richards so that he can trade him to Mephisto in exchange for the soul of his mother Cynthia Von Doom.

During the Acts of Vengeance storyline, a Doombot was used by Doctor Doom to serve as his proxy at the time when Loki has gathered some criminal masterminds to help in his plot. The Doombot sent The Assembly of Evil to attack the Avengers at a press conference only for them to take on She-Hulk and Cloak and Dagger.

Silver Sable and the Wild Pack fought Doombots that were working for an Imposter Doctor Doom.

A Doombot later goes on a rampage in the city. When the Fantastic Four and the Avengers cannot be reached to deal with the situation, Code: Blue manages to take it down with help from the Yancy Street Gang.

A young boy named Billy hires Heroes for Hire to look for his missing robot Victor. Billy's robot Victor is actually a reprogrammed Doombot that has fallen under the control of the Headmen where they use it to attack Billy and Humbug. Victor the Doombot later attacks Heroes for Hire which results in the death of Orka.

Following the Civil War storyline, Doombot designed to look like Doctor Doom was built to appear at Stilt-Man's funeral.

During the Dark Reign storyline, Black Panther was meeting with Namor about joining the Cabal (which also consisted of Doctor Doom, Emma Frost, Hood, Loki, and Norman Osborn). When Black Panther refused the offer, he is attacked by Doctor Doom and the Doombots.

Doctor Doom later refits the Doombots to attack Donald Blake. Thor later fights a Doombot before he takes on Doctor Doom in a pilotable robot that is modeled after the Destroyer.

During the Siege storyline, Doctor Doom uses a Doombot to attend a meeting of the Cabal and speaks through it to demand that Norman Osborn ceases his campaign against Namor. When the Doombot is taken down by Taskmaster, it releases a robotic swarm that is unleashed upon Avengers Tower. Norman Osborn finds a way to shut down the robotic swarm as Sentry destroys the Doombot.

During the Infinity storyline, some Doombots are shown to work at the Latverian School of Science as teachers. There's even a female version of a Doombot that works there as well.

Avengers A.I.'s Doombot
Following the Age of Ultron storyline, Hank Pym was seen with the head of a Doombot as he starts to work on it. Pym controls it with the constant threat of releasing a micro black hole he implanted in its chest cavity. The Doombot reluctantly ends up joining Henry Pym's Avengers A.I. alongside Monica Chang, Victor Mancha and Vision. This Doombot is shown as ruler of Earth in a possible future, where it summons various Avengers from different time periods together to defeat Ultron's conquest of the world before taking control itself. However, the Avengers are able to defeat Doom's armies by rescuing the forces of Asgard from imprisonment, followed by Vision convincing the Doombot to explore its own identity and acknowledge Doom's more positive traits rather than just blindly following the original Victor von Doom's example and cheapening his legacy by letting another define his path. In another possible future, Dimitrios, born from the Ultron Anti-virus, destroys all humanity, Kree, Skulls, and Inhuman life. Only the Avenger's A.I. survive to resist him. In 12,000 A.D. they have one last battle on the carcass of Galactus. Doombot sacrifices himself when Dimitrios kills Victor Mancha, the only person he ever called "Pal", by releasing the black hole in his chest.

Vincent Doonan
Following Squirrel Girl's time travel paradox, an artificially intelligent Doombot escaped from Doctor Doom and became a well-adjusted member of society. The man who fixed him and gave him a new human face had a problem with superheroes and other “weird” events in the Marvel Universe, which the Doombot inherited. Although he lived for decades in a small suburbs under the name Vincent Doonan, he had apparently secretly hired assassins to take out beings he considered strange, such as alien arms dealers. This led him to hire MODOK and then Gwenpool when she took over his organization. Gwen piqued his interest with her talk of her own world where such things never happen in real life, but Vincent decided she was weirder than the aliens and other "threats" and needed to die above all else as soon as he heard more about her world. He attempted to kill her, teaming up with the aliens he sent her to kill in the first place and kidnapping Gwen's co-workers and friends as hostages. He was ultimately beaten when Gwen threatened to blow up his neighbors if he did not turn on the aliens. Due to a misunderstanding, he was outed as a Doombot and given full credit for defeating the evil aliens, ruining his idealistic small town lifestyle.

Vincent has various weaponry, the ability to fly, anti-paranormal defense systems, artificial intelligence, and a red switch which will turn back on his Victor Von Doom personality if used. Gwen and her companions have repeatedly seen him on TV being touted as both a superhero and philanthropist since the loss of his secret identity. He, along with Spider-man Miles Morales and Gwen's friend The Terrible Eye were recently revealed to have possibly time travelled to the her first Christmas as part of a conspiracy to get Gwen's brother Teddy Poole to trap her before can she ruin their lives.

More recently Gwenpool decided to make a name for herself as a hero by taking down Dr. Doom, unaware that he was trying to be a hero himself. She used Vincent to track him down and while she was briefly imprisoned, Doom (whom Gwen thought was "Warmachine in a hoodie") and Vincent met. Although Vincent still does not like his creator, Doom told Vincent that he was very proud of the person the AI Doom-bot had become. Vincent helped Doom, Dr. Strange, and Terrible Eye perform a spell to return Gwen's sidekick Cecil to his human form and make his new monster body friendly. He later allows the current version of Squirrel Girl to examine him for her computer class, though the lesson is interrupted as she and Gwen go to Hell to save her brother from Mephisto.

Doombot Head

After Doom sent an army of Doombots to attack Moon Girl and Devil Dinosaur she confiscated one of the heads and re-purposed it to running her lair when she was away. So far it has done so by making flawed robotic copies of her to fill in while she was off planet.

Powers
The Doombots are heavily armored robots that are resistant to mental, emotional, and illusion attacks. All Doombots can shoot lightning from their gauntlets similar to Doctor Doom's attack.

The Doombots sport jetpacks which can enable them to fly.

There are small mechanic limbs and tools in the head of every Doombot that allows them to re-construct the rest of the body. This allows the robot to infiltrate in enemy fortresses. The pieces are sent through a different way, and the head builds the body in minutes.

Doombots can be set to self-destruct whenever they are in risk of being captured or defeated, or at Doom's whim.

Doombot models
There were different models of the Doombots:

 Diplomatic Doombots - These Doombots have a higher intelligence and normal armor levels. They lack the strength and reinforcement of the Fighting Doombots. Diplomatic Doombots are used in diplomatic meetings such as the United Nations and when dealing and/or negotiating with potential allies.
 Fighting Doombots - These Doombots are enhanced with super strength and reinforced for direct combat, even being able to hold their own temporarily with Thing. Doctor Doom sends a fighting Doombot whenever he considers a fight probable, as they are equipped with heavier weaponry and more weapon systems than the diplomatic models. Most of these combat Doombots are so strong that enemies quickly realize they are not fighting the real Doom, a non-enhanced human.
 AI Doombots - These Doombots can think for themselves and many believe that they are Doctor Doom. However their programming can be switched and they can act independently of Doom's will at times either for good or evil.

In other media

Film
 According to the director's commentary of Fantastic Four: Rise of the Silver Surfer, an early idea would have had a Doombot as the Doom of the film series with the real Doom ruling Latveria.

Television
 The Doombots made unnamed appearances in the Spider-Man and His Amazing Friends episode "The Fantastic Mr. Frump".
 The Doombots are merely the name of his robotic soldiers in Fantastic Four: World's Greatest Heroes. They are armed with weapons designed to counter the powers of the Fantastic Four (i.e. ice cannons for the Human Torch, concussion lasers for the Invisible Woman, etc.). Eventually, Doom constructs a bot running on a sophisticated Artificial Intelligence to the point it patterns on how organic brains operate. Aimed at adapting and learning how to defeat the FF, The Thing befriends the Doombot naming him "Bruiser".
 The Doombots appear in The Super Hero Squad Show voiced by Charlie Adler.
 The Doombots were mentioned as a joke in the Iron Man: Armored Adventures episode "The Might of Doom". A real Doombot was used in "Doomsday".
 The Doombots appear in The Avengers: Earth's Mightiest Heroes episode "The Private War of Doctor Doom".
 The Doombots appear in Ultimate Spider-Man, voiced by Maurice LaMarche. They are equipped with fewer weapons than the Mark VI, with the only equipment being rocket launchers and are more agile. They were first seen when Spider-Man and his team invaded Latveria to defeat and capture Doctor Doom in hopes of being recognized by Fury.
 The Doombots appear in the Avengers Assemble episode "The Serpent of Doom". The Avengers were attacked by Doombots and Doom Dogs, and they take them out until Doctor Doom bursts through the ground stating 'You dare trespass on Latverian soil!'.
 The Doombots appear in the Hulk and the Agents of S.M.A.S.H. episode "Days of Future Smash: The Dino Era". They are seen in the Latverian embassy guarding it while Doctor Doom is away. The Agents of S.M.A.S.H. fight through the Doombots at the time when Leader infiltrates the Latverian embassy to get to Doctor Doom's experimental time belts.

Video games
 The Doombots appear in Fantastic Four.
 The Doombots appear in Marvel: Ultimate Alliance.
 The Doombots appear in Marvel Super Hero Squad.
 The Doombots appear in Marvel: Avengers Alliance.
 The Doombots appear in Lego Marvel Super Heroes.

Toys
 A Doombot was a playable character in the Galactic Guardians set of Marvel Heroclix.

Podcasts 

 A number of Doombots appear in the podcast Marvel's Wastelanders: Old Man Star-Lord.

References

External links
 Doombot at Comic Vine

Marvel Comics characters with superhuman strength
Marvel Comics supervillains
Marvel Comics robots
Doctor Doom
Fantastic Four